is a Japanese professional basketball player who plays for the Shiga Lakes of the B.League in Japan. He also plays for Japan men's national 3x3 team.

Non-FIBA Events statistics 

|-
| align="left" | 2015
| align="left" | Universiade Japan
|6 || || 6.55 ||.417  || .500 ||.750  || 1.3 ||0.5  || 0.3 ||0.0  || 3.0
|-
| align="left" | 2017
| align="left" | Universiade Japan
|7 || || 16.11 ||.319  || .100 ||.333  || 2.6 ||0.6  || 0.6 ||0.1  || 4.6
|-
! align="left" | 2015-17
! align="left" | Average
!13 || || 11.54 ||.339  || .214 ||.636  || 2.0 ||0.5  || 0.5 ||0.1  || 3.8
|-

Career statistics

Regular season 

|-
| align="left" |  2016-17
| align="left" |Shibuya
|  6 || 0 ||  4.29||  .231 || .111 || .000  || 0.5 ||  0.0 ||  0.0 || 0.0 ||  1.2
|-
| align="left" |  2017-18
| align="left" |Shibuya
|  23 || 3 ||  9.48||  .327 || .324 || .857  || 0.7 ||  0.3 ||  0.26 || 0.0 ||  2.3
|-
| align="left" |  2018-19
| align="left" |Shibuya
|  60 || 41 ||  16.42||  .351 || .372 || .706  || 1.2 ||  0.7 ||  0.3 || 0.03 ||  4.8
|-

Early cup games 

|-
|style="text-align:left;"|2018
|style="text-align:left;"|Shibuya
| 3 || 1 || 23.03 || .276 || .100 || 1.000 || 1.7 || 0.3 || 0 || 0 ||7.7
|-

Personal

His mother is from Akita Prefecture. He is a nephew of Kimikazu Suzuki, a basketball head coach.

External links

References

1995 births
Living people
Japanese men's basketball players
Japan national 3x3 basketball team players
Basketball players from Tokyo
Sun Rockers Shibuya players
Small forwards